Statistics of Swedish football Division 3 for the 1930–31 season.

League standings

Uppsvenska 1930–31

Östsvenska 1930–31

Mellansvenska 1930–31

Nordvästra 1930–31

Södra Mellansvenska 1930–31

Sydöstra 1930–31

Västsvenska 1930–31

Sydsvenska 1930–31

Footnotes

References 

Swedish Football Division 3 seasons
3
Sweden